Altitude Sports and Entertainment (usually referred to as simply Altitude) is an American regional sports cable and satellite television channel owned by Stan Kroenke's Kroenke Sports & Entertainment. The channel, which serves the Rocky Mountain region of the United States (specifically the Denver metropolitan area), features a mix of professional, collegiate, and high school sporting events as well as some entertainment-based programming.

Launched on September 4, 2004, Altitude is headquartered in the Denver suburb of Centennial, Colorado. Altitude also operates Altitude 2, a secondary overflow channel that is used in the event of scheduling conflicts with games simultaneously set to air on the main Altitude channel.

History
Altitude Sports and Entertainment was launched on September 4, 2004.  The channel was launched as a team-owned competitor to FSN Rocky Mountain (now known as AT&T SportsNet Rocky Mountain). It became the official broadcaster for both of Kroenke's teams on launch.

Altitude agreed to carry some games from the first season of the Fall Experimental Football League in October and November 2014.

Programming
The channel holds broadcast rights to the four Denver-based professional sports teams that are owned by Kroenke – the NBA's Denver Nuggets, the NHL's Colorado Avalanche, Major League Soccer's Colorado Rapids, and the  National Lacrosse League's Colorado Mammoth. Altitude features in-depth coverage of the four teams, including holding broadcast rights to the majority of Avalanche, Rapids and Nuggets games. The channel's logo bug changes colors depending on the team being broadcast (powder blue and gold for the Nuggets, burgundy and dark blue for the Avalanche, maroon and black for the Mammoth and burgundy and sky blue for the Rapids).

Altitude also holds television rights to Major League Lacrosse's Denver Outlaws and the AHL's Colorado Eagles (an affiliate of the Avalanche). Altitude also broadcasts live college athletics from the Rocky Mountain Athletic Conference. They also simulcast select college football games from Montana, Montana State, New Mexico State and the Southland Conference. The channel previously broadcast Southeastern Conference, Western Athletic Conference, Big East Conference, and Big 12 Conference games from ESPN+.

It also airs entertainment programming including live theatrical productions and concerts, as well as a simulcast of veteran basketball referee Irv Brown's weekdaily radio program. Former Colorado governor Bill Owens hosted a talk show on the network during the final two years of his administration.

As the team is principally owned by Kroenke, Altitude serves as production partner for the Los Angeles Rams' NFL preseason games.

On August 10, 2022, Altitude signed a two-year agreement with the Air Force Academy to air college football, men's and women's college basketball and college ice hockey events hosted by the Academy.

Broadcast regions
Altitude covers a ten-state area. Due to restrictions imposed by the NBA and NHL, Avalanche and Nuggets games are not available in all areas. To comply with these restrictions, Altitude divides its broadcast area into eight zones.

Distribution
On August 28, 2019, Altitude was dropped by Dish Network. Three days later, the channel was dropped by Comcast and DirecTV. All three providers are accusing Altitude of demanding significant annual price increases for the channel's content, which they deemed unacceptable. On October 31, 2019, Altitude was restored by DirecTV after the two sides reached a multi-year agreement. The disputes with Dish Network and Comcast remain unresolved.

On June 1, 2021, Altitude waived its exclusive local rights to broadcast game 5 of the NBA playoff game between the Denver Nuggets and the Portland Trail Blazers so that Comcast and Dish Network subscribers could watch the game on NBA TV (which would normally be subject to blackout restrictions). Altitude is one of a few major regional sports networks that Comcast does not carry. As Comcast is the largest cable provider in the Denver area, this means most Nuggets and Avalanche games are unavailable in Denver without a DirecTV subscription.

Unlike other regional sports networks, Altitude is unavailable on live streaming services such as Hulu, Sling TV or YouTube TV.

On October 6, 2022, Altitude and FuboTV announced an agreement that will allow the streaming service to carry the network, including Avalanche and Nuggets games throughout the ten-state region in time for the start of the 2022-23 NBA and NHL seasons.

On-air staff

Current on-air staff
 Kyle Keefe – host
 Todd Romero – secondary host

Colorado Avalanche
 Marc Moser – TV play-by-play 
 Mark Rycroft – TV studio analyst (rotating), TV analyst and radio analyst
 Kyle Keefe – TV studio host (rotating)
 Rachel Richlinski - TV rink-side reporter (rotating)
 Vic Lombardi - TV rink-side reporter (rotating)
 Conor McGahey – Radio play-by-play/analyst
 Mark Bertagnolli – Radio studio host
 Alan Roach – Public address

Colorado Rapids
 Richard Fleming – play-by-play
 Marcelo Balboa – analyst
 Alan Gordon – analyst

Denver Nuggets
 Chris Marlowe – play-by-play
 Bill Hanzlik – studio analyst
 Scott Hastings – analyst
 Todd Romero – host
 Katy Winge – reporter
 Chris Dempsey – reporter/analyst
 Vic Lombardi – host

Altitude HD
Altitude HD is a high definition simulcast feed of Altitude Sports and Entertainment, that broadcasts in the 1080i resolution format. The HD feed broadcasts Denver Nuggets and Colorado Avalanche games in HD. Colorado Rapids soccer matches are not available in HD. The channel also operates a high definition simulcast feed of Altitude 2.

References

English-language television stations in the United States
Sports television networks in the United States
Television stations in Denver
Television channels and stations established in 2004
Television networks in the United States
Kroenke Sports & Entertainment
2004 establishments in Colorado